Barillas Fútbol Club is a Guatemalan football club from Santa Cruz Barillas, Huehuetenango Department. It was founded on 1994 and currently plays at the Primera División de Ascenso, the second tier of Guatemalan football.

Current squad

References

Association football clubs established in 1994
Football clubs in Guatemala